The Port Adelaide v South Australia (1914) exhibition match played between  and the South Australian state team was an Australian rules football match played at the Jubilee Oval on 14 October 1914. The match saw one of seven South Australian Football League (SAFL) clubs in Port Adelaide take on a composite team of players from the remaining 6 clubs. Port Adelaide won the match by 58 points.

Background 
Prior to the match Port Adelaide had won the 1914 SAFL Grand Final after going through the season undefeated. In addition to winning the South Australian premiership the club also defeated the Victorian Football League (VFL) premier Carlton at Adelaide Oval for the 1914 Championship of Australia.

The match was held as the key attraction for the Eight Hours Day public holiday.

Match summary

Weather conditions 
A clear and sunny October day provided perfect, if slightly warm, conditions for the match.

First quarter 
The wind in the first quarter was in favour of South Australia.

Second quarter 
With the benefit of the wind in the second quarter Port Adelaide surged ahead kicking 5 goals 5 behinds to South Australia's 4 behinds.

Third quarter 
The third quarter featured a tussle between Sampson Hosking and Albert Klose. Horrie Pope relieved Harold Oliver of centre duties for a period.

Fourth quarter 
In the final quarter Port Adelaide's system and fitness overwhelmed South Australia kicking 6 goals 5 behinds to nothing.

Best on ground medal 
The medal for the best player during the match was awarded to Harold Oliver of Port Adelaide.

Teams

Scorecard

Port Adelaide vs. South Australia

References

1914 in Australian rules football
Australian rules football games
History of Australian rules football